The microbunodontines were an extinct subfamily of anthracotheres that were predominately a Paleogene group of Eurasian artiodactyls. The group died out at the end of the Late Miocene. It comprised the genera Anthracokeryx, Geniokeryx, Microbunodon, and possibly Etruscotherium. They are different from the other anthracothere lineages by their smaller size, slenderer limbs and male specimens having laterally compressed, longer canines. They were originally classified as members of the other subfamily of anthracotheres, Anthracotheriinae but recent phylogenetic studies have found them to be their own clade sister to Bothriodontinae.

References

Anthracotheres
Mammal subfamilies
Eocene first appearances